The Vertep is a Serbian Orthodox Christmas custom commonly practiced by the young male members of the Serbian Orthodox Church. It is usually performed on January 6, the Christmas Eve of the Orthodox calendar. This custom is called vertep (and the participants in it – vertepaši (вертепаши; singular: vertepaš, вертепаш). 

The word “vertep” comes from the Church Slavonic вєртє́пъ translates to the word “cave”, which refers to the birthplace of Jesus.

See also
Vertep theatre, a custom among East Slavic ethnic groups

References

Serbian traditions
Slavic Christmas traditions
Christmas in Serbia